Louie Rolko (born September 7, 1984, in Hudson, Ohio) is a former American soccer player, currently serving as head coach of the Lake Erie College men's soccer program.

Career

College and Amateur
Rolko attended Hudson High School in Hudson, Ohio before entering Baldwin-Wallace College in 2003.  He played four years of college soccer with the Jackets from 2003 to 2006.

In 2005 and 2006, Rolko also played for the Sioux Falls Spitfire in the fourth division USL Premier Development League during the collegiate off season.

Professional
Rolko turned professional in March 2007 when he signed with the Charleston Battery of the USL First Division after impressing in pre-season trials. He spent two seasons playing with the Battery, scoring one goal in 24 games, before being released after the end of the 2008 season.

On March 22, 2010, after two years out of the professional game, the Pittsburgh Riverhounds of the USL Second Division announced the signing of Rolko to a contract for the 2010 season. Rolko was the team captain for the 2012 campaign.

Coaching
On June 6, 2013, it was announced that Rolko would be returning to his alma mater to pursue a coaching career.

On March 1, 2017, Rolko was named the head coach of the Lake Erie College men's soccer program.

References

External links
 Pittsburgh Riverhounds bio
 Charleston Battery bio

Living people
1984 births
American soccer players
Sioux Falls Spitfire players
Charleston Battery players
Pittsburgh Riverhounds SC players
USL First Division players
USL League Two players
USL Second Division players
USL Championship players
People from Hudson, Ohio
Association football midfielders